The Moscow uprising of 1682, also known as the Streltsy uprising of 1682, was an uprising of the Moscow Streltsy regiments that resulted in supreme power devolving on Sophia Alekseyevna (the daughter of the late Tsar Aleksey Mikhailovich and of his first wife Maria Miloslavskaya). Behind the uprising lurked the rivalry between the Miloslavsky and Naryshkin relatives of the two wives of the late Tsar Aleksey (died 1676) for dominant influence on the administration of the Tsardom of Russia.

Course of events 
The death of Tsar Feodor III of Russia on 27 April (7 May N.S.) 1682 triggered the uprising. The Naryshkin brothers of Tsarina Natalia Naryshkina availed themselves of the interregnum and persuaded the Patriarch to proclaim her ten-year-old son Peter as the new Tsar of Russia. In their turn, the Miloslavsky party, which comprised the relatives of the late Tsarina Maria Miloslavskaya, spread rumours that the Naryshkins had strangled Maria's son, Peter's elder half-brother Ivan, in the Moscow Kremlin.

The Miloslavsky conspirators stirred up riots in the streets of the capital. They exploited the discontent of the Moscow regiments against their commanding officers, and on 11 May 1682 the mob of the Streltsy took over the Kremlin and lynched the leading boyars and military commanders, whom they suspected of corruption—Artamon Matveev, Mikhail Dolgorukov, and Grigory Romodanovsky.

A few days later, on 17 May, the rebels once again stormed  the royal residence and killed a number of Naryshkin supporters, including two of the Naryshkin brothers (Kirill and Ivan) in the presence of the young tsar Peter, their nephew. Mobs of poor people joined with the Streltsy, and the streets of Moscow saw several days of looting. The May uprising led to the proclamation of Peter's older half-brother Ivan V as the "first" tsar and the relegation of the young Peter I to second position, with Sophia, Ivan's full sister and Peter's half sister, acting as a regent for them both.

In the fall of 1682 Prince Ivan Andreyevich Khovansky (Tararui)—Sophia's close associate and one of the leaders of the rebellious Streltsy—turned against her. Supported by the Old Believers, Khovansky—who supposedly wanted to install himself as the new regent—demanded the reversal of Nikon's reforms. Sophia and her court had to flee the Moscow Kremlin and sought refuge in the Troitse-Sergiyeva Lavra. Eventually, Sophia managed to suppress the so-called Khovanshchina (Khovansky affair) with the help of Fyodor Shaklovity, who succeeded Khovansky in charge of the Muscovite army.

See also
 Copper Riot
 Khovanshchina, an opera by Modest Mussorgsky based on the events of the uprising.
 Streltsy uprising

References
  "Moscow Uprising of 1682" in the History of Russia by Sergey Solovyov

1682 riots
1682 in Russia
17th century in Moscow
Moscow rebellions
Riots and civil disorder in Russia
17th-century rebellions
Wars of succession involving the states and peoples of Europe